The seventh South American Junior Championships in Athletics were held in São Bernardo do Campo, Brazil, at the Estádio Distrital de Vila Euclides between September 8–14, 1968.

Participation (unofficial)
Detailed result lists can be found on the "World Junior Athletics History" website.  An unofficial count yields the number of about 176 athletes from about 8 countries:  Argentina (39),  Brazil (34), Chile (38), Colombia (5), Ecuador (5), Paraguay (17), Peru (23), Uruguay (15).

Medal summary
Medal winners are published for men and women
Complete results can be found on the "World Junior Athletics History" website.

Men

* = another source rather states: Hexathlon

Women

Medal table (unofficial)

References

External links
World Junior Athletics History

South American U20 Championships in Athletics
Athletics
South American U20 Championships
International sports competitions in São Paulo
International athletics competitions hosted by Brazil
1968 in youth sport